The final of the 1999 ICC Cricket World Cup was played at Lord's, London on 20 June 1999. This was the fourth time Lord's had hosted the final of an ICC Cricket World Cup, previously hosting finals in 1975, 1979 and 1983. Australia won their second title by defeating Pakistan by 8 wickets in the final. Shane Warne was declared Man of the Match.

Details

Match

Pakistan won the toss and elected to bat. In a fine bowling display, Australia bundled out Pakistan for a score of 132. Pakistan failed to build any substantial partnerships. The pick of the bowlers was Shane Warne who took 4 wickets for 33 runs from nine overs. In reply, Adam Gilchrist attacked immediately, making a quick 50. Australia won the match after 20.1 overs, losing just two wickets. Warne won the man of the match award and Australia lifted the World Cup.

External links

Cricket World Cup 1999 Scorecards in CricketFundas
Cricket World Cup 1999 from Cricinfo

1999 Cricket World Cup matches
cricket
Final, 1999 Cricket World Cup
1999 in English cricket
Cricket World Cup Final
Cricket World Cup Finals
Lord's
Cricket in London

fr:Coupe du monde de cricket de 1999
it:Coppa del Mondo di cricket 1999
mr:क्रिकेट विश्वचषक, १९९९
nl:Wereldkampioenschap cricket 1999
pt:Copa do Mundo de Críquete de 1999